Veszprém KC is a Hungarian handball club, based in Veszprém, Hungary.

European record
As of 17 September 2019:

EHF-organised seasonal competitions
Veszprém score listed first. As of 17 September 2019.

European Cup and Champions League

Cup Winners' Cup
From the 2012–13 season, the men's competition was merged with the EHF Cup.

Champions Trophy

References

External links
 Official website 
 Telekom Veszprém at eurohandball.com

Hungarian handball clubs in European handball